Adrián Martín Ugarriza Tello (born 1 January 1997) is a Peruvian professional footballer who currently plays for Sporting Cristal.

Club career

USM Porres
Ugarriza began his career with Peruvian Primera División side Universidad de San Martín de Porres, making his professional debut in the Copa Inca on 7 March 2014 against Sport Huancayo. He made his league debut for USM on 7 June 2014 in a match against César Vallejo. Ugarriza's first professional goal came on 13 August 2014 in a 4–2 win over Ayacucho. That season, he made a total of nine league appearances and seven in the Copa Inca. In 2015, he made three league appearances.

Universitario
On 25 November 2015, Ugarriza signed with Universitario ahead of the 2016 season. That season, he made eighteen league appearances, scoring four goals, and appeared in both legs of Universitario's playoff semi-final series against Melgar. Ugarriza also made his continental debut in the Copa Sudamericana that year as a substitute in a 3–1 loss to Ecuadorian side Emelec. The following season, he made eight league appearances before departing Universitario mid-season.

Real Garcilaso
On 18 August 2017, Ugarriza signed with Real Garcilaso. He made fourteen league appearances for Real that season, scoring two goals.

UTC Cajamarca
On 3 January 2018, Ugarriza signed a one-year contract with UTC Cajamarca. That season, he made a career-high 38 league appearances, scoring seven goals, and also made one appearance in the Copa Sudamericana against Uruguayan side  Rampla Juniors.

Alianza Lima
On 14 January 2020, Ugarriza signed with Alianza Lima. That season, he made eleven league appearances and played in both legs of the playoff final against Binacional. He also made three appearances for Alianza in the Copa Libertadores.

York9
On 24 February 2020, Ugarriza signed with Canadian Premier League side York9. In July he departed the club due to the COVID-19 pandemic, preventing him from coming to Canada.

Ciencano
On July 18, 2020 Ugarriza joined Cienciano.

International career
Ugarriza represented Peru at the 2013 South American U-17 Championship. He made nine appearances, including six starts.

Ugarriza was called up by the Peru U20 team for the 2015 South American U-20 Championship, where he was the second-youngest player on the team. He made six appearances in the competition, and scored goals against Uruguay and Paraguay. In 2017, Ugarriza was called up for his second South American U-20 Championship, where he made four appearances.

Career statistics

References

External links
 

1997 births
Living people
Association football forwards
Peruvian footballers
Footballers from Lima
Peruvian expatriate footballers
Expatriate soccer players in Canada
Peruvian expatriate sportspeople in Canada
Club Deportivo Universidad de San Martín de Porres players
Club Universitario de Deportes footballers
Real Garcilaso footballers
Universidad Técnica de Cajamarca footballers
Club Alianza Lima footballers
York United FC players
Cienciano footballers
Peruvian Primera División players
Peru youth international footballers
Peru under-20 international footballers
2015 South American Youth Football Championship players
Peruvian people of Argentine descent
Peruvian people of Spanish descent